Cuozhou Township (Mandarin: 措周乡) is a township in Jainca County, Huangnan Tibetan Autonomous Prefecture, Qinghai, China. In 2010, Cuozhou Township had a total population of 4,415 people: 2,194 males and 2,221 females: 991 under 14 years old, 3,105 aged between 15 and 64 and 319 over 65 years old.

References 

Township-level divisions of Qinghai
Huangnan Tibetan Autonomous Prefecture